Ukraine participated in the 2010 Summer Youth Olympics in Singapore.

Medalists

Archery

Boys

Girls

Mixed Team

Athletics

Boys
Track and Road Events

Field Events

Girls
Track and Road Events

Field Events

Badminton

Girls

Boxing

Boys

Canoeing

Boys

Girls

Diving

Boys

Girls

Fencing

Group Stage

Knock-Out Stage

Gymnastics

Artistic Gymnastics

Boys

Girls

Rhythmic Gymnastics 

Individual

Trampoline

Judo

Individual

Team

Modern pentathlon

Rowing

Sailing

One Person Dinghy

Shooting

Pistol

Rifle

Swimming

Tennis

Singles

Doubles

Taekwondo

Triathlon

Men's

Mixed

Weightlifting

Wrestling

Freestyle

Greco-Roman

References

External links
Competitors List: Ukraine

2010 in Ukrainian sport
Nations at the 2010 Summer Youth Olympics
2010